is one of 9 wards of Kobe, Japan. It has an area of 30.36 km², and a population of 212,111 (2012). South of the Hanshin Main Line, it is also home to some notable sake brewing areas, including Uozaki and Mikage.

Transportation

Railways
JR Kobe Line (Sumiyoshi - Settsu Motoyama - Konan-Yamate)
Hankyu Kobe Line (Mikage - Okamoto)
Hanshin Main Line (Ishiyagawa - Mikage - Sumiyoshi - Uozaki - Ōgi - Fukae)
Rokko Liner

Roads
Hanshin Expressway 3 - Kobe Route, 5 - Wangan Route
Route 2, Route 43, Route 171

Sea
Port of Kobe (Rokko Island)

Education
 

Universities:
 Kobe International University on Rokko Island
 Konan University
 Konan Women's University

Public high schools:
 Rokko Island High School (神戸市立六甲アイランド高等学校) on Rokko Island

Private high school:
Nada High School

International schools: 
 Canadian Academy on Rokko Island
 Deutsche Schule Kobe on Rokko Island

Former schools:
 Norwegian School - Moved to Rokko Island in 1990, closed in 2005.

References

External links

Official Site of Higashinada Ward 

Wards of Kobe